Earl of Sandwich is a noble title in the Peerage of England, held since its creation by the House of Montagu. It is nominally associated with Sandwich, Kent. It was created in 1660 for the prominent naval commander Admiral Sir Edward Montagu. He was made Baron Montagu of St Neots, of St Neots in the County of Huntingdon, and Viscount Hinchingbrooke, at the same time, also in the Peerage of England. The viscountcy is used as the courtesy title by the heir apparent to the earldom. A member of the prominent Montagu family, Lord Sandwich was the son of Sir Sidney Montagu, youngest brother of Henry Montagu, 1st Earl of Manchester (from whom the Dukes of Manchester descend), and Edward Montagu, 1st Baron Montagu of Boughton (from whom the Dukes of Montagu descended).

He was succeeded by his son, the second Earl. He briefly represented Dover in the House of Commons and served as Ambassador to Portugal and as Lord Lieutenant of Huntingdonshire and Cambridgeshire.

The second Earl's great-grandson was The 4th Earl of Sandwich, who was a prominent statesman and served as First Lord of the Admiralty and as Secretary of State for the Northern Department. Lord Sandwich is also remembered for sponsoring the voyages of discovery made by Captain James Cook, R.N., who named the Sandwich Islands in his honour, and as the namesake of the sandwich.

He was succeeded by his son, the fifth Earl. He sat as Member of Parliament for Brackley and Huntingdonshire and served as Vice-Chamberlain of the Household and as Master of the Buckhounds. His son, the sixth Earl, also represented Huntingdonshire in Parliament.

He was succeeded by his son, the seventh Earl. He held office in the first two Conservative administrations of the Earl of Derby as Captain of the Honourable Corps of Gentlemen-at-Arms and Master of the Buckhounds and was also Lord Lieutenant of Huntingdonshire. His eldest son, the eighth Earl, represented Huntingdon in the House of Commons as a Conservative and served as Lord Lieutenant of Huntingdonshire.

He was succeeded by his nephew, the ninth Earl. He was the son of Rear-Admiral the Hon. Victor Alexander Montagu, second son of the seventh Earl. Lord Sandwich was Member of Parliament for Huntingdon and Lord Lieutenant of Huntingdonshire.

His son, the tenth Earl, represented South Dorset in Parliament as a Conservative from 1941 to 1962, when he succeeded his father in the earldom and had to resign his seat in the House of Commons and enter the House of Lords. He disclaimed his peerages in 1964 but never returned to the House of Commons.

, the titles are held by his eldest son, the eleventh Earl, who succeeded in 1995. Lord Sandwich is one of the ninety elected hereditary peers that remain in the House of Lords after the passing of the House of Lords Act 1999, and sits as a cross-bencher.

The family seat is today at Mapperton in Dorset. From the 17th century until the 1960s, the family also owned Hinchingbrooke House in Huntingdonshire, now a school, from which the title Viscount Hinchingbrooke was derived.

Some historical papers of the family and its Hinchingbrooke estate are held by Cambridgeshire Archives and Local Studies at the County Record Office in Huntingdon.

Earls of Sandwich (1660)

Edward Montagu, 1st Earl of Sandwich (1625–1672)
Edward Montagu, 2nd Earl of Sandwich (1644–1689)
Edward Montagu, 3rd Earl of Sandwich (1670–1729)
Edward Richard Montagu, Viscount Hinchingbrooke (1692–1722)
John Montagu, 4th Earl of Sandwich (1718–1792) (eponymous inventor of the sandwich)
John Montagu, 5th Earl of Sandwich (1744–1814)
George John Montagu, 6th Earl of Sandwich (1773–1818)
John William Montagu, 7th Earl of Sandwich (1811–1884)
Edward George Henry Montagu, 8th Earl of Sandwich (1839–1916)
 The Honourable Victor Alexander Montagu (1841–1915)
George Charles Montagu, 9th Earl of Sandwich (1874–1962)
(Alexander) Victor Edward Paulet Montagu, 10th Earl of Sandwich (1906–1995) (disclaimed 1964)
John Edward Hollister Montagu, 11th Earl of Sandwich (b. 1943)

The heir apparent is the present holder's elder son, Luke Timothy Charles Montagu, Viscount Hinchingbrooke (b. 1969), who is married to an American entrepreneur, Julie Jean Montagu, Viscountess Hinchingbrooke. The heir apparent's heir apparent is their elder son together, The Hon. William James Hayman Montagu (b. 2004).

Line of succession (selected) 

  Alexander Victor Edward Paulet Montagu, 10th Earl of Sandwich (1906—1995) (disclaimed 1964)
  John Montagu, 11th Earl of Sandwich (born 1943)
(1) Luke Timothy Charles Montagu, Viscount Hinchingbrooke (b. 1969)
 (2) The Hon. William James Hayman Montagu (b. 2004)
 (3) The Hon. Nestor John Sturges Montagu (b. 2006)
 (4) The Hon. Orlando William Montagu (b. 1971)
 (5) Walter Frederick Montagu (b. 2005)
 (6) The Hon. George Charles Robert Montagu (b. 1949)
 (7) Oliver Drogo Montagu (b. 1974)
 (8) Cosimo Ralph Montagu (b. 1988)

Notes

References

External links

Earldoms in the Peerage of England

Noble titles created in 1660
1660 establishments in England